The Marche regional election of 2015 took place on 31 May 2015.

Luca Ceriscioli of the Democratic Party (PD) was elected President by defeating a fractured field of opponents, notably including the incumbent President, Gian Mario Spacca, who had switched sides from the PD to a centre-right coalition led by Forza Italia.Results

See also 

2015 Italian regional elections

References

Elections in Marche
2015 elections in Italy
May 2015 events in Italy